There is recognition for the United States Champion Thoroughbred Trainer by wins but no formal award is given to the trainer in Thoroughbred flat racing whose horses won the most races in North American Thoroughbred racing.

Dale Baird holds the record for the most national titles with fifteen. Second is Hirsch Jacobs who won more races during a year than any other American trainer on eleven occasions. Tied for third all-time are Jack Van Berg and Steve Asmussen with nine. H. Guy Bedwell, trainer of Triple Crown winner Sir Barton, was a seven-time champion.

Champions since 1907:

See also
 United States Champion Thoroughbred Trainer by earnings

References

 Steve Asmussen at the NTRA
 Scott Lake at the NTRA

American Champion racehorse trainers
Horse racing-related lists
Horse racing in the United States
Racehorse training awards